The LSU Tigers swimming and diving team represents Louisiana State University (LSU) in the Southeastern Conference in NCAA men's swimming and diving. The team competes at the LSU Natatorium in Baton Rouge, Louisiana. Dave Geyer is the co-head coach of the men's swim team. Doug Shaffer is the co-head coach of the men's diving teams.

History
The LSU men's swimming and diving team first competed in 1936, finishing third at the Southeastern Conference championship. There were no teams from 1940 to 1967, but in 1968 the men's swimming and diving team was reinstated.

Championships
SEC Championships: 1988

Olympic & notable swimmers and divers
 Mark Andrews
 Andy Deichert
 Jarrod Marrs
 Todd Torres

Tigers head coaches

Swimming and Diving facilities

LSU Natatorium
The LSU Natatorium is a swimming & diving facility located on the campus of Louisiana State University in Baton Rouge, LA.  The facility, built in 1985, serves as the home of the LSU Tigers swimming and diving team. The stadium has a seating capacity of 2,200. The Natatorium features a 50-meter pool, which can be converted into two 25-meter or 25-yard pools with the use of bulkheads and includes a championship diving well with one- and three-meter springboards and five-, seven- and 10-meter platforms.

Huey P. Long Field House
The Huey P. Long Field House was home to the LSU Tigers swimming and diving team until the LSU Natatorium was built in 1985.

Strength and Conditioning facilities

LSU Strength and Conditioning facility
 
The LSU Tigers basketball strength training and conditioning facility is located in the LSU Strength and Conditioning facility. Built in 1997, it is located adjacent to Tiger Stadium. Measuring 10,000-square feet with a flat surface, it has 28 multi-purpose power stations, 36 assorted selectorized machines and 10 dumbbell stations along with a plyometric specific area, medicine balls, hurdles, plyometric boxes and assorted speed and agility equipment. It also features 2 treadmills, 4 stationary bikes, 2 elliptical cross trainers, a stepper and stepmill.

See also
List of college swimming and diving teams

References

External links
 

 
Sports clubs established in 1969
1969 establishments in Louisiana